Selaginella erythropus is a species of plant in the Selaginellaceae family, endemic to the Yucatan and Belize to Colombia and was introduced to Tanzania. It grows up to  30–40 cm in height with a bright red main stem. It likes plentiful water and humidity and enjoys temperatures of 50-75 degrees Fahrenheit (10-24 degrees Celsius). The top of the plant is green and the undersides of the leaves are a bright, ruby red color. It is a species of spike moss (also known as clubmoss) which is related to the fern family. Spike mosses reproduce through spores just like ferns do.

Synonyms
 Lycopodium erythropus Mart.

References
 Fl. Bras. 1(2): 125 1840.
 The Plant List
 JSTORE
 Encyclopedia of Life

erythropus